"Dust" is episode 48 of the American television anthology series The Twilight Zone. It originally aired on January 6, 1961 on CBS, and was the 12th episode of the second season. The episode was written by series creator Rod Serling, and was directed by Douglas Heyes. It starred Thomas Gomez in his second appearance on the show following "Escape Clause", as well as Vladimir Sokoloff, in the first of his three appearances on the series.

Opening narration

Plot
In the Old West, in a desolate barren town, the sadistic and unscrupulous peddler Sykes mocks Luis Gallegos, who is due to be hanged. Luis is guilty of driving drunk and accidentally killing a child. Luis' father arrives in the village and pleads with the mother and father of the dead girl to spare his son the hanging. His pleas fall on deaf ears. After selling the executioner some five-strand rope needed for the hanging, Sykes sells a bag of dust to the condemned man's father, collecting ordinary dirt from the ground and insisting that it is magic dust that will spread good will throughout the crowd and make them feel love and sympathy for Luis.

As the crowd gathers for the hanging, Luis' father cries out and starts sprinkling the dust everywhere. He hears the trapdoor drop behind him and turns to see that the fresh and sturdy rope has snapped above the noose, and Luis is unharmed. When asked if another hanging attempt should be made, the girl's parents decide that it should not, that Luis has suffered enough and maybe they have had a sign from God. As father and son walk home, Sykes rechecks the rope which appears to be in perfect condition. Then he throws his gold pieces from the sale of the dust to the poor children of the town, insisting that they have them. He walks away from the scene bemused, stating that the dust must have been magic after all.

Closing narration

Cast
 Thomas Gomez as Sykes 
 Vladimir Sokoloff as Gallegos 
 John Larch as The Sheriff 
 John Alonzo as Luis Gallegos
 Paul Genge as John Canfield 
 Dorothy Adams as Mrs. Canfield
 Duane Grey as Rogers 
 Andrea Darvi as Estrellita Gallegos

See also
 List of The Twilight Zone (1959 TV series) episodes

References
DeVoe, Bill. (2008). Trivia from The Twilight Zone. Albany, GA: Bear Manor Media. 
Grams, Martin. (2008). The Twilight Zone: Unlocking the Door to a Television Classic. Churchville, MD: OTR Publishing.

External links
 

1961 American television episodes
The Twilight Zone (1959 TV series season 2) episodes
Television episodes written by Rod Serling
Television episodes directed by Douglas Heyes